The 2018 Sudan Cup is the 43rd edition of the Sudanese knockout football competition since its inception in 1990.  Al Merrikh triumphed over  Hilal Al-Obied by a score of 4-1.

Round of 16

|}

Quarter-finals

|}

Semi-finals

|-
!colspan=3|26 Sep 2018

|-
!colspan=3|29 Sep 2018

|}

Final

|-
!colspan=3|7 Oct 2018

|}

See also
2018 Sudan Premier League

References

External links
Sudan Cup 2018, Goalzz.com

Sudan
football
Football competitions in Sudan